Torilis leptophylla is a species of hedge parsleys in the Apiaceae known as bristlefruit hedgeparsley.

Description

Range

Habitat

Ecology

Etymology

Taxonomy

References

Apioideae